Klaus Basikow (12 June 1937 – 5 March 2015) was a German football player and manager.

Born in Berlin, Basikow made a total of 14 appearances in the Bundesliga for SC Tasmania 1900 Berlin during his playing career and later managed SC Wacker 04 Berlin and Tennis Borussia Berlin in the 2. Bundesliga North.

References

External links 
 

1937 births
2015 deaths
Footballers from Berlin
German footballers
Association football goalkeepers
Bundesliga players
German football managers
Tennis Borussia Berlin managers
SV Meppen managers